The wedding of Carl XVI Gustaf, King of Sweden, and Silvia Sommerlath took place on Friday, 19 June 1976 at Storkyrkan. Carl XVI Gustaf had been reining king of Sweden since 1973 and Sommerlath was a German-born translator. The couple had met at the 1972 Summer Olympic Games in Munich and became engaged in 1976. 

Olof Sundby, Archbishop of Uppsala, presided over the Church of Sweden ceremony in Storkyrkan. The ceremony was attended by the bride's and groom's families, as well as members of foreign royal families, diplomats, and various Swedish and German officials. 

It was the first marriage of a reigning Swedish monarch since King Gustav IV Adolf married Princess Frederica of Baden in 1797. Sommerlath became Sweden's first queen consort since 1965.

Engagement

In 1972, then Crown Prince Carl Gustaf attended the Summer Olympics in Munich, West Germany, where interpreter Silvia Sommerlath was charged with escorting him. In a later interview, the King explained how it just "clicked" when they met. In the subsequent years, Carl Gustaf's mother, Princess Sibylla, died, as did his grandfather, Gustaf VI Adolf, and he, therefore, acceded to the Swedish throne. 

On 12 March 1976, King Carl XVI Gustaf announced his engagement to Silvia Sommerlath. The King presented his fiancée with a single solitaire ring set with a 2-carat diamond. The ring once belonged to his late mother.

The date was set for 19 June. The same date that the future King Oscar I married Josephine of Leuchtenberg in 1823 and their son, the future King Charles XV married Princess Louise of the Netherlands in 1850. 34 years later, their daughter, Victoria, married Daniel Westling on the same date in the same cathedral.

Pre-wedding celebrations
Sommerlath was unable to join the King for the celebrations of Sweden's National Day on 6 June due to illness. Despite her illness, she was present when the banns of marriage were read the following day in the Royal Chapel.

On 17 June, Sommerlath was given the Royal Order of the Seraphim and became a Swedish citizen. On 18 June, a gala performance was at the Royal Swedish Opera where Swedish pop group ABBA first performed their song Dancing Queen in honour of their queen-to-be. The gala performance was followed by a ball at Drottningholm Palace. At the insistence of the king's sisters, Silvia wore the Connaught Diamond Tiara which had been a favourite of their late mother.

Wedding

The wedding began at 12:00 CET on 19 June 1976. The Church of Sweden ceremony was officiated by Olof Sundby, Archbishop of Uppsala, in Storkyrkan. At approximately 12:45, the marriage was solemnized and Sommerlath automatically became Queen consort of Sweden.

Music
The bride and groom entered together to Johan Helmich Roman's "Sinfonia de Chiesa". The service included several Swedish hymns. The couple proceeded back down the aisle to "Sinfonia in D major, BWV 1045" by Johann Sebastian Bach.

Attire
The bride wore a silk duchesse satin gown with a high neck, long sleeves, slim skirt and train extending from the shoulders designed by Marc Bohan for Dior. Sommerlath wore a lace veil that had belonged to Queen Sofia and was worn by the King's mother and sisters on their wedding days. The gown was deliberately left simple to highlight the heirloom veil. The veil was anchored by the Cameo Tiara, which had belonged to Empress Joséphine and was worn by the King's sisters, Princess Birgitta and Princess Désirée, on their wedding days in 1961 and 1964, respectively. The bride's mother discreetly placed a handkerchief around her daughter's wrist with a rubber band, this is viable in some photos. The seamstresses who worked on the dress were not told at the time they were working on the future Queen of Sweden's dress.       

The groom wore the uniform of an Admiral in the Swedish Royal Navy with the insignia of the Order of the Seraphim, Order of the Sword, Order of the Polar Star, Order of Vasa and the Order of Merit of the Federal Republic of Germany.

Attendants 
The couple had six child attendants: Prince Hubertus of Hohenzollern, son of the groom's sister, Princess Birgitta; Master James Ambler, son of the groom's sister, Princess Margaretha; Baroness Hélène Silfverschiöld, daughter of the groom's sister, Princess Désirée; Miss Carmita Sommerlath, daughter of the bride's brother, Ralf Sommerlath; Miss Sophie Sommerlath, daughter of the bride's brother, Walther Sommerlath; and Miss Amelie Middelschulte, daughter of the bride's friend, Beate Middelschulte.

Guests

Relatives of the groom
 Princess Margaretha, Mrs Ambler, and Mr John Ambler, the groom's sister and brother-in-law
 Miss Sybilla Ambler, the groom's niece
 Master Edward Ambler, the groom's nephew
 Master James Ambler, the groom's nephew
 Princess Birgitta and Prince Johann Georg of Hohenzollern, the groom's sister and brother-in-law
 Prince Carl Christian of Hohenzollern, the groom's nephew
 Princess Désirée of Hohenzollern, the groom's niece
 Prince Hubertus of Hohenzollern, the groom's nephew
 Princess Désirée, Baroness Silfverschiöld, and Baron Niclas Silfverschiöld, the groom's sister and brother-in-law
 Baron Carl Silfverschiöld, the groom's nephew
 Baroness Christina-Louise Silfverschiöld, the groom's niece
 Baroness Hélène Silfverschiöld, the groom's niece
 Princess Christina, Mrs Magnuson, and Mr Tord Magnuson, the groom's sister and brother-in-law
 Count Sigvard and Countess Marianne Bernadotte af Wisborg, the groom's paternal uncle and aunt
 The Duke of Halland and Mrs Lilian Davies, the groom's paternal uncle and his partner
 Count Carl Johan and Countess Kerstin Bernadotte af Wisborg, the groom's paternal uncle and aunt

Relatives of the bride
 Mr and Mrs Walter Sommerlath I, the bride's parents
 Mr and Mrs Ralf Sommerlath, the bride's brother and sister-in-law
 Miss Carmita Sommerlath, the bride's niece
 Mr Jörg Sommerlath, the bride's brother
 Mr and Mrs Walther Sommerlath II, the bride's brother and sister-in-law
 Miss Sophie Sommerlath, the bride's niece

Foreign royal guests
  Queen Ingrid of Denmark, the groom's paternal aunt
  The Queen and Prince Henrik of Denmark, the groom's first cousin and her husband
  The Princess and Prince of Sayn-Wittgenstein-Berleburg, the groom's first cousin and her husband
  The King of Norway, the groom's second cousin once removed
  The Crown Prince and Crown Princess of Norway, the groom's third cousin and his wife 
  The King and Queen of the Belgians, the groom's second cousin once removed, and his wife
  The Grand Duke and Grand Duchess of Luxembourg, the groom's second cousin once removed and her husband
  Princess Beatrix and Prince Claus of the Netherlands, the groom's third cousin and her husband (representing the Queen of the Netherlands)
  The Duke and Duchess of Cádiz, the groom's third cousin and his wife (representing the King of Spain)
  The Duke and Duchess of Gloucester, the groom's third cousin and his wife (representing the Queen of the United Kingdom)
  The Earl Mountbatten of Burma, the groom's paternal step-granduncle (and second cousin once removed) 
  Captain Alexander Ramsay of Mar and The Mistress of Saltoun, the groom's first cousin once removed and his wife

Members of non-reigning royal houses
 Tsar Simeon II and Tsarista Margarita of Bulgaria, the groom's fourth cousin once removed and his wife
 King Constantine II and Queen Anne-Marie of the Hellenes, the groom's third cousin and first cousin

Republican heads of state
  Urho Kekkonen, President of the Republic of Finland
  Walter Scheel, Federal President of the Federal Republic of Germany, and Mrs Scheel
  Kristján Eldjárn, President of the Republic of Iceland, and Mrs Eldjárn

Aftermath

Upon marriage, Sommerlath immediately became queen consort of Sweden, the first since the death of Louise Mountbatten, her husband's step-grandmother, eleven years earlier. The couple drove through Stockholm in an open landau before returning to the Royal Palace for a luncheon reception for 300 guests. The newlyweds appeared on the balcony where they were serenaded by 200 folk musicians from Dalarna. An estimated 200,000 people lined the streets of Stockholm. 

The couple honeymooned in Hawaii, Botswana and finally at Solliden Palace in Öland. The wedding boosted the popularity of the monarchy as the public saw the bachelor king settling down.

The couple has three children, Victoria (b. 1977), Carl Philip (b. 1979) and Madeleine (b. 1982), and eight grandchildren. In 2010, their daughter, Victoria, married Daniel Westling on the same date in the same cathedral, becoming the fourth Swedish royal couple to marry on 19 June.

Reference

Swedish royal weddings
Marriage, unions and partnerships in Sweden
Sweden
1976 in Sweden
1970s in Stockholm
June 1976 events in Europe